Applewhaite is a surname. Notable people with the surname include:

Ackeel Applewhaite (born 1999), Barbadian footballer
Andre Applewhaite (born 2002), Barbadian footballer
Edward Applewhaite (1898–1964), Canadian politician